Vathsalya is a 1965 Indian Kannada-language film, directed by Y. R. Swamy. The film stars Rajkumar, Udaykumar, Narasimharaju and Shivaraj. The film has musical score by Vijaya Krishnamurthy. The film was a remake of the Tamil film Pasamalar. It was a big hit. This is the only movie in which Leelavathi played the role of Rajkumar's sister.

Cast

Rajkumar as Rajasekhar
Udaykumar as Anand
Narasimharaju as Cheluvaraya
Shivaraj
Kuppuraj
Ganapathi Bhat
Krishna Shastry
Nanjappa
Siddaraj
Siddalingappa
Narayan
Leelavathi as Radha
Jayanthi as Malathi
Papamma
Rama
Baby Ramamani
Baby Sunitha

Soundtrack
The music was composed by Vijaya Krishnamurthy.

References

External links
 

1965 films
1960s Kannada-language films
Kannada remakes of Tamil films
Films directed by Y. R. Swamy